The Remaining Signs of Past Centuries (also known as Chronology of Ancient Nations or Vestiges of the Past, after the translation published by Eduard Sachau in 1879) by Abū Rayhān al-Bīrūnī, is a comparative study of calendars of different cultures and civilizations, interlaced with mathematical, astronomical, and historical information, exploring the customs and religions of different peoples.

Completed in 1000 AD (AH 390/1), it is Al-Biruni's first major work, compiled in Gorgan, at the court of Qabus, when he was in his late twenties.

Overview

The text survives in an early 14th-century Ilkhanid manuscript by Ibn al-Kutbi (the "Edinburgh codex", AH 707 / AD 1307–8, 179 folios, Northwestern Iran or northern Iraq, kept at the Edinburgh University Library, MS Arab 161). The manuscript contains 25 paintings and survives also in an exact 17th-century Ottoman copy (MS Arabe 1489, kept in the Bibliothèque nationale de France).

 interprets the choice and placement of illustrations throughout the text as a cycle which emphasizes the interest of the Ilkhanids in religions other than the predominant Islam, many illustrations showing specific episodes related to Manichaeism, Buddhism, Judaism, and Christianity. Other illustrations show a keen interest in topics of history and science. The account of the birth of Julius Caesar is illustrated with a realistic rendition of a cesarean section.

The Shi`ite inclination of those responsible for the production is particularly evident from the two concluding images, the largest and most accomplished in the manuscript, which illustrate two episodes in the life of Muhammad, both centrally involving `Ali, Hasan, and Husayn: The Day of Cursing (fol. 161r) and The Investiture of `Ali at Ghadir Khumm (fol. 162r). The manuscript has a total of five images depicting Muhammad, including the first miniature which shows the Prophet as he prohibits Nasīʾ (fol. 6v). [The cycle is among the earliest depictions of Muhammad in Persian art. The earliest extant representation of Muhammad in a Persian manuscript is in the Marzubannama of 1299 (Archaeology Museum Library, Istanbul, MS 216).]

The style of the images is kept in a hybrid style between that of pre-Mongol period Persia and the Chinese style introduced with the Mongol invasions.

History
He discussed his idea of history in The Chronology of Ancient Nations, also known as The Remaining Signs of Past Centuries. It is a comparative study of calendars of different cultures and civilizations, interlaced with mathematical, astronomical, and historical information, exploring the customs and religions of different peoples.

In The Chronology of Ancient Nations, he mentions the birth and death of the Caliphs, Shia Imams, Fatimah (daughter of Muhammad) and Khadija (Muhammad's wife).

Mathematical geography
Discussing the astrolabe, Al-Biruni considers the orthographic cylindrical projection as his own invention, expanding upon the work of Al-Saghani. He also describes two novel projections he has created, which are nowadays called the azimuthal equidistant and the Nicolosi globular.

Editions
 C. Eduard Sachau (ed.), Chronologie orientalischer Völker von Alberuni, Leipzig 1878 (Internet Archive link), reprinted Leipzig 1923, Baghdad 1963.
 C. Eduard Sachau (transl.), The Chronology of Ancient Nations:  An English Version of the Arabic Text of the Athâr-ul-Bâkiya of Albîrûnî, or 'Vestiges of the Past', Collected and Reduced ... by the Author in A. H. 390 - 1, A. D. 1000 , London 1879 (Internet Archive link).
 1969 reprint: Minerva-Verlag; Unverand edition.
 1984 reprint: Aristide D Caratzas Pub. .
 2002 reprint: Adamant Media Corporation, .
 2004 reprint: Kessinger Publishing, .

Notes

References

Sources

External links
 

Al-Biruni
Calendars
Islamic calendar
Persian art
Scientific illuminated manuscripts
Illuminated histories
Islamic illuminated manuscripts
1000 books
10th-century Arabic books